Baturalp Burak Gungor (born 28 July 1993) is a Turkish male volleyball player. He is part of the Turkey men's national volleyball team. On club level he plays for Galatasaray.

References

External links
Profile at FIVB.org
Player profile at Volleybox.net

1993 births
Living people
Turkish men's volleyball players
Place of birth missing (living people)
Ziraat Bankası volleyball players
Competitors at the 2018 Mediterranean Games
Mediterranean Games competitors for Turkey
Galatasaray S.K. (men's volleyball) players
İstanbul Büyükşehir Belediyespor volleyballers
Arkas Spor volleyball players
21st-century Turkish people